"You're Somebody Else" is a song by the Swedish-American indie pop duo Flora Cash. The song was initially included on the band's debut full-length album, Nothing Lasts Forever (And It's Fine), which was released on 20 April 2017 via Stockholm-based indie label Icons Creating Evil Art, before being licensed to Sony Music's RCA Records after achieving viral success. Upon the band's signing to RCA, the track was removed from the digital version of the album (worldwide, except in Scandinavia) while being allowed to remain on the vinyl version. The song achieved its initial viral success after being used in a Movistar commercial in Mexico promoting safety for young people meeting each other online. After debuting on Pandora Radio's Predictions chart in August 2018 and retaining the No. 4 spot there well into September, "You're Somebody Else", reached the Top 10 on both the Billboard Alternative Songs and Adult Alternative Songs airplay charts that November.

The song eventually reached the number one position on American radio on both the Mediabase Adult Alternative and Alternative radio formats. 

To date, the track has garnered over 360 million streams on Spotify and the lyric video has been viewed over 180 million times on YouTube.

Background
The song was written in less than 24 hours while songwriters Cole Randall and Shpresa Lleshaj were staying at Shpresa's sister's apartment in Stockholm. Shpresa's sister, Swedish actress Ariana Lleshaj and her fiancé had gone on a trip to New York, and asked if Cole and Shpresa would like to stay in their apartment for a change of scenery. The couple; Cole in particular, had been going through a period of anxiety leading up to the writing of the song.

Song description
According to Cole and Shpresa, the main lyric in the song, you look like yourself but you're somebody else was "more a matter of one speaking to oneself than to another person." They went on to say, "sometimes when we’re dealing with psychological issues, we literally feel displaced internally; alien to ourselves. [The song] ended up taking on multiple meanings and perspectives but the root of it at the beginning was as a sort of self-talk, self-therapy."

Critical reception
The song was given positive reviews. Steve Baltin, writing for Forbes Magazine wrote that "[Flora Cash's] brilliant "You're Somebody Else" is arguably the most intriguing song on radio this past year." Comeherefloyd wrote that the track "hounds and whispers that secret dark self doubt, deep within ourselves."

Television
On 9 August 2018, Flora Cash performed "You're Somebody Else" on The Late Late Show with James Corden, marking their television debut.

On 28 February 2019, Flora Cash performed "You're Somebody Else" on Live with Kelly and Ryan, marking their first live television performance.

Charts

Weekly charts

Year-end charts

Certifications

References

2017 singles
2017 songs
RCA Records singles